Ghafe (باكستان) is a village located in Mardan District of Khyber-Pakhtunkhwa. Nearby is  Takht-i-Bahi Buddhist temple.

Populated places in Mardan District